Jamaica is a town and consejo popular ("popular council") in San José de las Lajas, Mayabeque Province, Cuba. Jamaica is 17 mi (28 km) away from the capital, Havana.

References 

San José de las Lajas
Mayabeque Province
Populated places in Mayabeque Province